Shin Ha-eun is a South Korean television screenwriter best known for her global hit Netflix original series Hometown Cha-Cha-Cha (2021). She also work as co-author for two tvN dramas, Argon (2017) and The Crowned Clown (2019).

Shin is also known as graduates of 2017 CJENM O'PEN Content Creator Project. Her winning script was produced into an episode of tvN 2018 Drama Stage Anthology or also known as Collection of Poems.

Career

2017 CJENM O'PEN Content Creator Project 
Shin initially dreamed of becoming a poet. After graduating from the Department of Korean Literature, Shin studied modern poetry in graduate school. When her advisor in the graduate retired and she was in a temporary hiatus. Shin dreamed of becoming a drama writer the enrolling in a writer's education institute. Shin studied writing in The Broadcasting Writers Education Center in Seoul. The center was founded in 1988 by the Korea Television and Radio Writers Association (KTRWA) As television screenwriter, Shin Ha-eun is current member of KTRWA. Her name and her copyrighted work can be found in KTRWA online database.

Shin was one of 2017 O'PEN writers. O'PEN writers were recruited through an open call between January and March 2017. A total of 3,700 aspiring writers applied for competition with scripts for dramas or films during the contest period of about two months. Dozen of various drama and film industry officials judged the script in two to three rounds. The jury finally selected 35 new writers, including 20 new drama writers and 15 new movie writers.

Just two months after Shin won O'PEN, Lee Yoon-jeong, personally made a 'love call' to her to be part of the writing team of her next drama. Shin co-authored tvN Argon with two other writers Joon Young-shin and Joo Won-gyu. Directed by Lee Youn-jeong, this eight episodes mini series is focused on Team Argon, an investigative television program that strive on pursuing facts. It show dynamic between Kim Baek-jin (Kim Joo-hyuk) a perfectionist news anchor, reporter and leader of Argon and Lee Yeon-hwa (Chun Woo-hee), a temporary employee who dream to be a reporter. The drama was aired on cable channel tvN every Monday and Tuesday at 22:50 (KST) from September 4–26, 2017.

In November 2017, tvN announced that Shin Eun-soo and Lee Jae-won have confirmed their appearances as the female and male protagonists of for Shin's one-act drama's Anthology (Collection of Poem). In this project, Shin reunite with director of Argon Lee Youn-jeong. Broadcast in January 6, Anthology was part six of ten episodes of 2018 tvN Drama Stage.{{efn|Drama Stage is a South Korean weekly television program that features ten one-act dramas, which is similar to KBS2's Drama Special. The short plays were created by writers selected from O'PEN Drama Storyteller Exhibition held by CJ E&M, and these are adapted as one-act dramas produced by the former's subsidiary Studio Dragon in partnership with other companies. It aired on tvN every Saturday at midnight.}}

 Debut as drama writer 

CJ E&M announced in April 2018 that their first four 2017 O'PEN writers had recently signed a writing contract with a leading domestic drama production company. One of them was Shin Ha-eun, who signed a contract with Studio Dragon to write a mini-series from 16 episodes to a maximum of 32 episodes. This marked her full-fledged debut as a drama writer.

In November 2019, CJ E&M announced that three of their 2017 O'PEN graduated writers will enter the industry by co-authoring drama series scheduled to be aired on terrestrial and cable television. With senior writer Kim Seon-deok, Shin Ha-eun co-authored tvN drama The Crowned Clown. This sixteen episodes historical drama was a remake of the 2012 film Masquerade. The series centers on the tale of a Joseon King and his doppelganger, a clown whom he puts on the throne to escape the intense power struggles afflicting the royal court.

 First project as main writer 
Shin Ha-eun first project as main writer was a 2021 remake of movie Mr. Handy, Mr. Hong (2004). The series, was first announced on December 21, 2020, under the working title of Hong Ban-jang with Kim Seon-ho and Shin Min-a being offered the lead roles. Final English working title was decided as Hometown Cha-Cha-Cha, matching the drama storyline of a love story between a realist dentist Yoon Hye-jin (Shin Min-a) and an all-rounder, Hong Banjang (Kim Seon-ho) in his hometown Gongjin. It was premiered in August 2021 in cable channel tvN at 21:00 (KST) and followed one hour later in Netflix streaming platform.

Promoted as healing romance drama, Hometown Cha-Cha-Cha received favorable reviews from domestic and foreign viewers. It entered the list of the highest-rated series on cable television history. It ranked first place during its entire run for eight weeks, and the last episode achieved 12.665% nationwide rating, with over 3.2 million views.Hometown Cha-Cha-Cha became one of Netflix's most-watched non-English television shows. According to FlixPatrol, the series placed number 8th on its global chart. It also became one of Netflix's most-watched non-English television shows, and one of its longest-running hits as it spent 16 weeks in global top ten ranking in more than 20 countries. It also remained on Netflix's Top 10 Chart for television shows for more than two months from its last episode.

On December 21, 2020, Kim Soo-hyun Drama Art Hall operated by Cheongju City Culture Industry Promotion Foundation, selected Hometown Cha-Cha-Cha as '2021 Good Drama of the Year'. Shin Ha-eun as writer, Yoo Je-won as director, were written in the certificate of award along with name of main casts. It was selected by both the viewer evaluation team and expert group and it was praised as a 'K-healing drama' that appeared at a time when sensational genre content was overflowing, and was loved by domestic and foreign viewers.

On February 15, 2022, CJ ENM announced that it had signed an audio content partnership agreement with 'Willa'. As the first project, the contents of 23 storytellers from O'PEN will be produced as an audio drama and sequentially presented through Willa from June 2022. Anthology (2018) by Shin, were selected to be produced as audio drama.

Due to Hometown Cha-Cha-Cha success as representative hallyu content, Shin was invited to do special lecture on December 8, 2022 in Korea Arts Center (KAC) hosted by Broadcasting Writer and Creative Art Departement. Through this special lecture, Shin gave various practical tips on creating material such as selecting materials that advantageous for drama production, character creation, and the importance of the first scene, and gave a variety of information to the attendees by mentioning the reason and opportunity for becoming a drama writer.

The Ministry of Culture, Sports and Tourism (Minister Park Bo-gyun, hereinafter the Ministry of Culture, Sports and Tourism), together with the Korea Creative Content Agency (Director Cho Hyun-rae), held the '2022 Korea Content Awards Ceremony' at COEX on December 14, and presented content officials and excellent content that made Korea shine this year. Awards are given to 36 people (cases). The 'Korea Contents Awards Ceremony', which celebrated its 14th this year, is an event that awards works and people who have contributed to shining the Korean content industry and providing emotion and joy to the people. Shin received the Minister's Commendation for contribution to the development of the broadcasting and video industry for Hometown Cha-Cha-Cha. Award body said this commendation was given due to Writer Shin showed the potential of a good drama by portraying the conflict, love, and growth of various characters in a small fishing village through Hometown Cha-Cha-Cha. In particular, Hometown Cha-Cha-Cha'' received absolute support from the Asian region through Netflix and continued to enter the global top 10 throughout its airing. In addition, it contributed to revitalizing the local economy, such as the main location (Pohang) being loved as a tourist destination.

Works

Television series

Audio drama

Scriptbook

Accolades

Awards and nominations

State honors

Notes

References

External links 
 
 
 Shin Ha-eun at Naver

Living people
Year of birth missing (living people)
People from Seoul
South Korean screenwriters
South Korean television writers